The Carolina Cobras were an expansion franchise in the Arena Football League. The team was formed prior to the 2000 season, which endured a player strike.

The team was originally based in Raleigh, North Carolina, but moved to Charlotte following its third season.

History
They played their home games in Raleigh, North Carolina, at the Raleigh Entertainment & Sports Arena (now called the PNC Arena) prior to the 2003 season. The team was based in the Charlotte Coliseum through 2004. Coaching staff included: Ed Khayat, John Gregory, Ron Selesky, Ray Jauch. On September 20, 2004, prior to the arrival of the NBA's Charlotte Bobcats, the league announced the termination of this franchise; its players were made available to the other AFL teams in a dispersal draft.

Legacy
The Cobras' legacy in Charlotte was actually meant to fill open dates at the Charlotte Coliseum when the original Charlotte Hornets moved to New Orleans. When the Charlotte Bobcats began play, the Cobras were no longer necessary.

The Cobras' name (previously used for one year by the Charlotte Cobras of the Major Indoor Lacrosse League) is now in use by the city of Charlotte for its works team in the National Public Safety Football League.

Season-by-season

Notable players

Arena Football Hall of Famers

All-Arena players
The following Cobras players have been named to All-Arena Teams:
 WR/LB Cory Fleming (1)

All-Ironman players
The following Cobras players have been named to All-Ironman Teams: 
 WR/DB Cornelius White (1)
 WR/LB Cory Fleming (1)

All-Rookie players
The following Cobras players have been named to All-Rookie Teams:
 OL/DL Silas DeMary

External links
 Carolina Cobras at ArenaFan.com

 
American football teams in North Carolina
2000 establishments in North Carolina
2004 disestablishments in North Carolina